Schopfloch is a municipality  in the district of Ansbach in Bavaria in Germany. It is the home of Lachoudisch, a rare Hebrew-infused German dialect.

References

Ansbach (district)